Ocean Gate is a borough in Ocean County, New Jersey, United States. As of the 2010 United States Census, the borough's population was 2,011, reflecting a decline of 65 (−3.1%) from the 2,076 counted in the 2000 Census, which had in turn declined by 2 (−0.1%) from the 2,078 counted in the 1990 Census.

History

Trains operated to the area by Pennsylvania Railroad served what was called "Good Luck Point", with visitors building cottages that were the start of the community that became Ocean Gate. AT&T operated a shortwave radio transmitting station after purchasing  in 1929.

The borough of Ocean Gate was incorporated by an act of the New Jersey Legislature on February 28, 1918, from portions of Berkeley Township. An additional portion of Berkeley Township was annexed on February 28, 1953.

Geography
According to the United States Census Bureau, the borough had a total area of 0.54 square miles (1.41 km2), including 0.45 square miles (1.17 km2) of land and 0.09 square miles (0.24 km2) of water (17.22%).

The borough is bordered by the Ocean County municipality of Berkeley Township.

The borough, including its northern half, is one of 11 municipalities in Ocean County that are part of the Toms River watershed.

Demographics

Census 2010

The Census Bureau's 2006–2010 American Community Survey showed that (in 2010 inflation-adjusted dollars) median household income was $61,250 (with a margin of error of +/− $9,978) and the median family income was $73,056 (+/− $23,241). Males had a median income of $61,932 (+/− $6,721) versus $43,295 (+/− $6,037) for females. The per capita income for the borough was $29,770 (+/− $4,691). About 2.2% of families and 6.3% of the population were below the poverty line, including 11.3% of those under age 18 and 5.2% of those age 65 or over.

Census 2000

As of the 2000 United States Census there were 2,076 people, 832 households, and 546 families residing in the borough. The racial makeup of the borough was 96.53% White, 0.96% African American, 0.14% Native American, 0.96% Asian, 0.53% from other races, and 0.87% from two or more races. Hispanic or Latino of any race were 2.36% of the population.

There were 832 households, out of which 32.6% had children under the age of 18 living with them, 44.0% were married couples living together, 16.2% had a female householder with no husband present, and 34.3% were non-families. 28.1% of all households were made up of individuals, and 11.1% had someone living alone who was 65 years of age or older. The average household size was 2.50 and the average family size was 3.06.

In the borough the population was spread out, with 26.0% under the age of 18, 7.0% from 18 to 24, 32.2% from 25 to 44, 20.3% from 45 to 64, and 14.5% who were 65 years of age or older. The median age was 37 years. For every 100 females, there were 88.9 males. For every 100 females age 18 and over, there were 82.2 males.

The median income for a household in the borough was $41,067, and the median income for a family was $50,847. Males had a median income of $33,558 versus $30,919 for females. The per capita income for the borough was $19,239. About 7.6% of families and 10.3% of the population were below the poverty line, including 12.0% of those under age 18 and 4.3% of those age 65 or over.

Government

Local government
Ocean Gate is governed under the Borough form of New Jersey municipal government, which is used in 218 municipalities (of the 564) statewide, making it the most common form of government in New Jersey. The governing body is comprised of the Mayor and the Borough Council, with all positions elected at-large on a partisan basis as part of the November general election. The Mayor is elected directly by the voters to a four-year term of office. The Borough Council is comprised of six members elected to serve three-year terms on a staggered basis, with two seats coming up for election each year in a three-year cycle. The Borough form of government used by Ocean Gate is a "weak mayor / strong council" government in which council members act as the legislative body with the mayor presiding at meetings and voting only in the event of a tie. The mayor can veto ordinances subject to an override by a two-thirds majority vote of the council. The mayor makes committee and liaison assignments for council members, and most appointments are made by the mayor with the advice and consent of the council.

, the Mayor of Ocean Gate is Republican David Kendrick, whose term of office ends December 31, 2022. Members of the Borough Council are Council President Mark Haug (R, 2023), Bruce Cox (R, 2024;appointed to serve an unexpired term), Robert Livingston (R, 2022), Joella Nicastro (R, 2022), Laura Padham-Iaria (R, 2024) and Mildred Sheppard (R, 2023).

In April 2020, after then-mayor Paul J. Kennedy was charged with official misconduct related to theft of borough-owned property that had been taking place for five years, the borough council cut the mayor's salary down from $50,000 to one dollar After Kendrick resigned from the seat expiring in December 2022, the borough council appointed Paul J. Kennedy to fill the vacant mayoral seat; in turn, Bruce Cox was appointed to fill Kendrick's vacated council seat that expires in December 2024.

Democrats Rose Kindon and Chris Theodos replaced Frank Santarpia and James McGrath, who resigned in February 2014 in protest over an increase in the Mayor's compensation to $50,000. The Mayor was later cited and fined for ethics violation by the NJ State Local Finance Board for illegally accepting pay as a municipal employee while he was serving as mayor.

Federal, state, and county representation
Ocean Gate is located in the 4th Congressional District and is part of New Jersey's 9th state legislative district.

 

Ocean County is governed by a Board of County Commissioners comprised of five members who are elected on an at-large basis in partisan elections and serving staggered three-year terms of office, with either one or two seats coming up for election each year as part of the November general election. At an annual reorganization held in the beginning of January, the board chooses a Director and a Deputy Director from among its members. , Ocean County's Commissioners (with party affiliation, term-end year and residence) are:

Commissioner Director John P. Kelly (R, 2022, Eagleswood Township),
Commissioner Deputy Director Virginia E. Haines (R, 2022, Toms River),
Barbara Jo Crea (R, 2024, Little Egg Harbor Township)
Gary Quinn (R, 2024, Lacey Township) and
Joseph H. Vicari (R, 2023, Toms River). Constitutional officers elected on a countywide basis are 
County Clerk Scott M. Colabella (R, 2025, Barnegat Light),
Sheriff Michael G. Mastronardy (R, 2022; Toms River) and
Surrogate Jeffrey Moran (R, 2023, Beachwood).

Politics
As of March 23, 2011, there were a total of 1,287 registered voters in Ocean Gate, of which 336 (26.1%) were registered as Democrats, 387 (30.1%) were registered as Republicans and 563 (43.7%) were registered as Unaffiliated. There was one voter registered to another party. Among the borough's 2010 Census population, 64.0% (vs. 63.2% in Ocean County) were registered to vote, including 82.2% of those ages 18 and over (vs. 82.6% countywide).

In the 2012 presidential election, Republican Mitt Romney received 50.4% of the vote (415 cast), ahead of Democrat Barack Obama with 47.9% (395 votes), and other candidates with 1.7% (14 votes), among the 835 ballots cast by the borough's 1,335 registered voters (11 ballots were spoiled), for a turnout of 62.5%. In the 2008 presidential election, Republican John McCain received 52.7% of the vote (504 cast), ahead of Democrat Barack Obama with 44.5% (426 votes) and other candidates with 2.0% (19 votes), among the 957 ballots cast by the borough's 1,314 registered voters, for a turnout of 72.8%. In the 2004 presidential election, Republican George W. Bush received 61.2% of the vote (2,125 ballots cast), outpolling Democrat John Kerry with 37.5% (1,304 votes) and other candidates with 0.7% (34 votes), among the 3,475 ballots cast by the borough's 4,769 registered voters, for a turnout percentage of 72.9.

In the 2013 gubernatorial election, Republican Chris Christie received 70.9% of the vote (458 cast), ahead of Democrat Barbara Buono with 27.4% (177 votes), and other candidates with 1.7% (11 votes), among the 664 ballots cast by the borough's 1,264 registered voters (18 ballots were spoiled), for a turnout of 52.5%. In the 2009 gubernatorial election, Republican Chris Christie received 60.3% of the vote (420 ballots cast), ahead of Democrat Jon Corzine with 30.7% (214 votes), Independent Chris Daggett with 5.9% (41 votes) and other candidates with 1.4% (10 votes), among the 697 ballots cast by the borough's 1,284 registered voters, yielding a 54.3% turnout.

Education

The Ocean Gate School District is a public school district that serves students in pre-kindergarten through sixth grade at Ocean Gate Elementary School. As of the 2018–2019 school year, the district, comprised of one school, had an enrollment of 142 students and 15.4 classroom teachers (on an FTE basis), for a student–teacher ratio of 9.2:1. In the 2016–2017 school year, Ocean Gate was tied as having the 26th smallest enrollment of any school district in the state, with 149 students.

Public school students in seventh through twelfth grades attend the schools of the Central Regional School District, which serves students from Ocean Gate and from the municipalities of Berkeley Township, Island Heights, Seaside Heights and Seaside Park. Schools in the high school district (with 2018–2019 enrollment data from the National Center for Education Statistics) are 
Central Regional Middle School with 769 students in grades 7–8 and 
Central Regional High School with 1,483 students in grades 9–12. The high school district's board of education consists of nine members, who are directly elected by the residents of the constituent municipalities to three-year terms of office on a staggered basis, with three seats up for election each year. Ocean Gate is allocated one of the board's nine seats.

Transportation

No Interstate, U.S. or state highways serve Ocean Gate. The main roads serving the borough are minor county roads, such as County Route 625.

Notable people

People who were born in, residents of, or otherwise closely associated with Ocean Gate include:

 Rob Beaton, Guinness World Record holder ("Most Eggs Held in the Hand" – 17, "Most Grains of Rice Eaten with Chopsticks in 3 Minutes" – 78)

References

External links

 Ocean Gate official borough website
 Ocean Gate Elementary School
 
 School Data for the Ocean Gate Elementary School, National Center for Education Statistics
 Central Regional School District

 
1918 establishments in New Jersey
Borough form of New Jersey government
Boroughs in Ocean County, New Jersey
Populated places established in 1918